Calvin Jack Davies (born 7 September 1997) is an English professional footballer who plays for Bognor Regis Town after starting his career at Portsmouth, he plays as a right back.

Club career

Portsmouth
Born in Portsmouth, Davies progressed through Portsmouth's youth categories. He signed a two-year scholarship contract on 4 July 2014.

Davies made his professional debut on 1 September 2015, starting in a 0–2 Football League Trophy away defeat against Exeter City. On 25 September, he was loaned to Havant & Waterlooville, but appeared rarely.

On 25 January 2016, Davies was loaned to Bognor Regis Town. On 25 April, he signed a one-year professional deal with the club.

Davies was loaned to Bognor for the majority of the 2016-17 season where he featured in 30 games as Bognor finished 2nd and won promotion via the playoffs. On 10 May 2017, Portsmouth released a statement confirming that Davies would be released by the club at the end of his contract, a fact he already revealed a day before through his Twitter account., After training with Bristol City and Yeovil Town, Davies signed for 2017 National League South newcomers Bognor Regis Town F.C. after previously playing with them on a loan basis.

Career statistics

References

External links

1997 births
Living people
Footballers from Portsmouth
English footballers
Association football defenders
Portsmouth F.C. players
Havant & Waterlooville F.C. players
Bognor Regis Town F.C. players
National League (English football) players